Apoptosis-inducing factor, mitochondria-associated 3 is a protein that in humans is encoded by the AIFM3 gene.

References

Further reading